The Shire of Gayndah was a local government area located in the northern catchment of the Burnett River, Queensland, Australia.

Major activities in the shire included citrus production, beef and timber.

History

The first local government in the area was the Borough of Gayndah, serving the town of Gayndah, which was created on 28 November 1866 under the Municipal Corporations Act 1864. Under the Divisional Boards Act 1879, the Rawbelle Division was created on 11 November 1879 to serve the surrounding rural area with a population of 755. The headquarters of the Rawbelle Division was in the town of Gayndah and the first meeting of the divisional board was held on 29 March 1880 and the first elected chairman was Berkeley Moreton, who would later inherit the title Earl of Ducie.

On 31 March 1903, following the enactment of the Local Authorities Act 1902, the Borough of Gayndah became the Town of Gayndah and Rawbelle Division became Shire of Rawbelle.

The Shire of Rawbelle was renamed Shire of Gayndah on 17 March 1923, and on 24 May 1924 the Town of Gayndah was amalgamated into the Shire of Gayndah.

On 15 March 2008, under the Local Government (Reform Implementation) Act 2007 passed by the Parliament of Queensland on 10 August 2007, the Shire of Gayndah merged with the Shires of Eidsvold, Biggenden, Monto, Mundubbera and Perry to form the North Burnett Region.

Chairmen
 1880 Berkeley Moreton, 4th Earl of Ducie
 1917: H. E. M. Leggett
 1927: H. E. M. Leggett

H. E. M. Leggett was chairman of the shire for 25 years.

Towns and localities
The Shire of Gayndah included the following settlements:

 Gayndah
 Ban Ban Springs
 Binjour
 Byrnestown
 Gooroolba
 Ideraway
 Wetheron

Population

References

Former local government areas of Queensland
2008 disestablishments in Australia
Populated places disestablished in 2008